Thalwil is a municipality and town in the district of Horgen in the canton of Zürich in Switzerland. In addition to the town of Thalwil, the municipality includes the village of Gattikon.

History
Thalwil is first mentioned around 1030 as Talwile villam, which is derived from Tellewilare, Tello's Farm, and indicates the early medieval origins of Thalwil as an Alemannic farmstead. Only a few graves remain from this period.  In 1133, it was mentioned as Telwil.

The parish of Thalwil originally comprised four Wachten (hamlets):
Ludretikon, the oldest hamlet (mentioned in 915), bordering Rüschlikon
Oberdorf (Upper Village), the area around the church
Unterdorf (Lower Village), the area roughly south of the railway station
Langnau, which separated from Thalwil around 1713

In medieval times, the economy consisted mainly of farms, vineyards as well as a small amount of fishing, crafts and shipping (on the lake). This estate was once owned by the Dukes of Habsburg and held by the Barons of Eschenbach. The Abbeys of Muri and Wettingen also had significant interests and owned 12 and 3 farms respectively.

Thalwil also boasts the oldest wood corporation in the Canton of Zurich, the Bannegg-Waldung. It was first mentioned in 1483, when Muri Abbey granted it to the twelve beneficiaries of the Abbey farms in Thalwil. Today the corporation is owned by 16 members as well as by the Thalwil Gemeinde.

Geography

The municipality of Thalwil is located on the Zimmerberg ridge between the western shore of Lake Zurich and the Sihl river. It includes the town of Thalwil, on the eastern slopes of the ridge alongside the lake, and the village of Gattikon, on the westen slopes and the bank of the Sihl. Thalwil borders on the communes of Rüschlikon, Langnau am Albis, Oberrieden, Horgen and (across the lake) Erlenbach.

Of this area, 18% is used for agricultural purposes, while 23.8% is forested. Of the rest of the land, 56.1% is settled (buildings or roads) and the remainder (2.2%) is non-productive (rivers, glaciers or mountains).   housing and buildings made up 42.3% of the total area, while transportation infrastructure made up the rest (13.7%). Of the total unproductive area, water (streams and lakes) made up 1.4% of the area.   51.3% of the total municipal area was undergoing some type of construction.

Coat of arms
The Gemeindewappen (communal flag or coat of arms) consists of two diagonally crossed black bulrushes with green stems and leaves on a white background.

Demographics
Thalwil has a population of 18,066 (as of 2019). , 21.4% of the population was made up of foreign nationals.  , the gender distribution of the population was 48.5% male and 51.5% female. Over the last 10 years the population has grown at a rate of 6%.  Most of the population speaks German (84.0%), with Italian being second most common (4.5%) and English being third (2.3%).

The age distribution of the population is children and teenagers (0–19 years old) make up 18.8% of the population, while adults (20–64 years old) make up 65.6% and seniors (over 64 years old) make up 15.6%.  In Thalwil about 81.5% of the population (between age 25–64) have completed either non-mandatory upper secondary education or additional higher education (either university or a Fachhochschule).  There are 7,680 households in Thalwil.

The historical population is given in the following table:

Election results 
In the 2007 elections, the most popular party was the SVP, receiving 28.5% of the vote. The next three most popular parties were the SP (19.7%), the FDP (18.2%), and the CSP (11.4%).

The most recent Swiss federal elections for the Nationalrat (National Council) and Ständerat (Council of States) took place in 2019. In the Nationalrat elections, the largest party in Thalwil was the SVP, with 21.6% of the vote. Five other parties received over a hundred votes. Those were, in order of descending votes: the FDP (20.1%), the GLP (14.8%), the SP (14.5%), the Greens (9.9%), and the CVP (now known as The Centre) (5.0%). In the canton-wide Ständerat election, Ruedi Noser of the FDP was reelected after the second round, winning 65.3% of votes in Thalwil.

Churches in Thalwil 

Thalwil is one of the oldest parishes on the shores of Lake Zurich. It also has one of the most spectacular church locations, with the Platte affording views of the lake and its surroundings from Zurich to the Alps.

The earliest recorded church was dedicated to St Martin in 1159. In medieval times it was a dependency of Wettingen Abbey. Although it was frequently hit by lightning and also looted and set on fire during the Old Zürich War (Alter Zürichkrieg), the original building survived for over six hundred years.

In 1845, the small and rather dilapidated chapel was demolished and replaced by a much larger church designed by Ferdinand Stadler. A fire set off during repairs on the tower burnt down the new church  almost 100 years later (1943) but the building was soon completely restored and has survived to this day.

, there were 5382 Catholics and 5881 Protestants in Thalwil. In the 2000 census, religion was broken down into several smaller categories. Of the rest of the population, 3.8% were Muslim, 5.8% belonged to another religion (not listed), 2.6% did not give a religion, and 15% were atheist or agnostic.

Industrialisation 
In the late 1830s, the lakeside road (Seestrasse) was opened. It soon attracted large silk, cotton and other textile factories to the former farming village, some run by local families such as Schwarzenbach, Schmid, and Kölliker. This growth was boosted by the new railway lines from Zurich to Pfäffikon (1875) and Zug (1897). Industrialisation brought new workers into the former farming village and increased the population from 1,318 (in 1833) to 6,791 (in 1900).

As of 2020, Thalwil has an unemployment rate of 3.1%. , there were 5 people employed in the primary economic sector and 2 businesses involved in this sector. 1,001 people are employed in the secondary sector and there are 106 businesses in this sector. 5,576 people are employed in the tertiary sector, with 1,193 businesses in this sector. , 28.6% of the working population were employed full-time, and 71.4% were employed part-time.

Taxes 
According to the statistical office of Canton Zurich, Thalwil receives 92.0 million Franc in tax revenue every year, as of 2020. 11,022 people pay taxes to Thalwil.

Modern-day Thalwil 
Today this industrial past has all but vanished. The economy of Thalwil is mainly supported by a variety of small and medium-sized businesses, many located in the Böhni commercial estate opened in 1971. This includes Unisys Switzerland, which is the largest employer in Thalwil (over 500 jobs). There is also a range of shops, mainly located around the Gotthardstrasse.

The main source of Thalwil's current prosperity lies in the large number of commuters (ca. 7 000) who live there but work in the economic centres of Greater Zurich. Today, Thalwil has mostly left its farming and industrial past behind and become a commuter base.

Transportation
Thalwil is located along the A3 motorway from Zurich to Chur as well as on the main railway lines from Zurich to Chur, Lucerne and Italy. In the summer, there are regular boats to Zurich as well as along the lake to Rapperswil, run by the Zürichsee-Schifffahrtsgesellschaft. Thalwil railway station is served by lines S2, S8, S21 and S24 of the Zürich S-Bahn. The Zimmerberg bus line (Zimmerbergbus), provided by the Sihltal Zürich Uetliberg Bahn (SZU), connects the Zimmerberg region and parts of the Sihl valley.

Sightseeing 
Church with views over the lake
Pfisterhaus with the village museum
Etzliberg viewing point and old half-timbered houses
Villa Diana, the 19th-century neo-baroque residence of factory owner Julius Schwarzenbach

Notable people 

 Tina Keller-Jenny (1887-1985) Swiss physician and Jungian psychotherapist, brought up in the Jenny-Castle, Thalwil
 Hans Johner (1889 – 1975 in Thalwil) a Swiss chess player and musician
 Ferdinand Sigg (1902 in Thalwil – 1965) bishop of the Methodist Episcopal Church
 George Piranian (1914 in Thalwil – 2009) a Swiss-American mathematician of Swiss and Armenian descent, emigrated to the US in 1929
 Ursula Schäppi (born 1940), actress, playwright and comedian; lives in Thalwil 
 Urs Schwarzenbach (born 1948 in Thalwil), UK-based Swiss billionaire financier
 Bruno Saile (born 1952 in Thalwil) a Swiss rower
 Reto Salimbeni (born 1958, in Thalwil) a filmmaker and director known for his features and commercials 
 Martin Bäumle (born 1964 in Thalwil) is a Swiss scientist and politician
 Manuela Müller (born 1980 in Thalwil) a Swiss freestyle skier, competed at the 2002 and 2006 Winter Olympics
 Adrian Winter (born 1986 in Thalwil) a Swiss professional footballer, over 250 club caps

See also
Spelunke in vivo

References

External links 

Official website of the Thalwil Gemeinde 

Blog about life in Thalwil 
Thalwiler Anzeiger newspaper 

 
Cities in Switzerland
Municipalities of the canton of Zürich
Populated places on Lake Zurich